Joachim "Blacky" Fuchsberger (pronounced ; 11 March 1927 – 11 September 2014) was a German actor and television host, best known to a wide German-speaking audience as one of the recurring actors in various Edgar Wallace movies (often a Detective Inspector with Scotland Yard). In the English-speaking world, he was sometimes credited as Akim Berg or Berger.

Life and career
Fuchsberger was born in Zuffenhausen, today a district of Stuttgart, and was a member of the obligatory Hitler Youth. During World War II, at the age of 16, he was trained as a Fallschirmjäger, combat instructor and sent to the Eastern Front where he was wounded. He was captured in a hospital in Stralsund by the Red Army and came into Soviet captivity and later in American and British captivity. Because of this turbulent time of his youth in Second World War, he never obtained a school diploma. In 1946, he worked as a coal miner for the British in Recklinghausen. His nickname Blacky hails from that time.

After his release, he worked as an engineer for typesetting and printing machines in the family business and later in a publishing house in Düsseldorf. In 1949, he was advertising manager of the German Building Exhibition in Nuremberg. From 1950 to 1952, he was spokesman at the radio station in Munich and newsreel spokesman. In 1951, he married the pop singer Gitta Lind, from whom he divorced after two years. In 1954 he married the radio technician and actress Gundula Korte (born 24 March 1930), with whom he has a son. In the same year he had his breakthrough playing "Gunner Asch" in the three-part war film 08/15 film series, based on the novel by Hans Hellmut Kirst.

After several war films, he starred in the 1959 film Der Frosch mit der Maske (The Frog with the Mask) playing amateur detective Richard Gordon. More than 3.2 million visitors saw the movie in the cinema. The surprising success laid the foundation for many other film adaptations of novels by Edgar Wallace.

Fuchsberger was the stadium announcer for the opening and closing ceremonies of the 1972 Summer Olympics in Munich. During the closing ceremony, it was suspected that a hijacked passenger aircraft was on its way to the stadium. Fuchsberger, fearing a panic, decided against evacuation. This decision was vindicated when the original suspicion turned out to have been false.

In the late 1960s, Fuchsberger co-founded a real estate company that went bankrupt in a short time. At 42, he had lost his entire fortune, had to sell his villa and sat on a mountain of debt. With the help of his wife, Gundula, good friends and tireless work, he managed to discharge the debt and to start a new existence.

In 1978, he was bitten by a chimpanzee during a TV show and fell seriously ill with hepatitis B. He spent 4 months at the quarantine station and suffered through a depression but recovered. He withdrew from film and television work in the late 1970s and concentrated on his stage career. In the late 1990s he started reappearing in some television movies, which after a break he continued from the late 2000s until his death.

In 1984, he was the first German ambassador for UNICEF. On 13 November 2006, he was awarded the Bavarian State Medal for Social Services for those activities. Since 2009, Fuchsberger is member of the Board of Trustees of the 2011 FIFA Women's World Cup and co-patron of the volunteer program for the FIFA Women's World Cup 2011.

His son,  (1957–2010), was a composer and drowned in Kulmbach on 14 October 2010. Late in life, Fuchsberger lived in Grünwald near Munich and in Sandy Bay, Hobart, Tasmania. He held Australian citizenship together with his original German one. He died of organ failure at his German home in Grünwald on 11 September 2014.

Awards
1942 – War Merit Cross 2nd Class with Swords
1961 – Bravo Otto
1961 – 
1969 – Bambi Award
1970 – International Film Ribbon (Italy)
1970 – Bravo Otto
1971 – Bravo Otto
1972 – Bravo Otto
1979 – Bavarian Order of Merit
1982 – Goldene Kamera
1982 – Bambi Award
1983 – Federal Cross of Merit
1985 – Der liebe Augustin (Austria)
1986 – Goldene Europa
1983 – 
1994 – Grand Federal Cross of Merit
1999 – Honorary Ambassador of Tourism (Tasmania)
2005 – Bavarian TV Awards
2006 – 
2007 – 
2007 –  in the category Lifetime Achievement Award
2008 – Platin Kurier Romy
2009 – 
2010 – Goldene Kamera for Lifetime Achievement
2011 – Deutscher Fernsehpreis for Lifetime Achievement
2011 – German Sustainability Award
2012 – Bambi Award for his life's work

Selected filmography

1953: Open Your Window (Director: Anton Kutter)
1954: Wenn ich einmal der Herrgott wär (Director: Anton Kutter) .... Fred
1954: 08/15 (Director: Paul May) .... Gefreiter Asch
1955: The Song of Kaprun (Director: Anton Kutter) .... Der 'schöne Eugen'
1955:  (Director: Paul May) .... Wachtmeister Asch
1955: The Last Man (Director: Harald Braun) .... Alwin Radspieler
1955:  (Director: Paul May) .... Leutnant Herbert Asch
1956: Symphonie in Gold (Director: Franz Antel) .... Walter Gerlos
1956:  (Director: Franz Antel) .... Johann Leim, Tischler
1956: Wenn Poldi ins Manöver zieht (Director: Hans Quest) .... Thomas
1957:  (Director: Carl Boese) .... Journalist Harry Greif
1957: Kleiner Mann – ganz groß (Director: Hans Grimm) .... Thomas Olderhoff
1957: Song of Naples (Director: Carlo Campogalliani) .... Franco Ferri
1957: Illusionen (TV Movie,) .... Tom
1957: The Twins from Zillertal (Director: Harald Reinl) .... Franz von Auerstein
1957: Hafenmelodie (Director: Joachim Fuchsberger)
1958: Eva küßt nur Direktoren (Director: Rudolf Jugert) .... Karl Müller
1958: The Green Devils of Monte Cassino (Director: Harald Reinl) .... Lt. Reiter
1958: Liebe kann wie Gift sein (Director: Veit Harlan) .... Stefan Bruck
1958: U 47 – Kapitänleutnant Prien (Director: Harald Reinl) .... Oberleutnant Thomas Birkeneck
1958:  (Director: Eugen York) .... Norbert Wilms
1958: Mein Schatz ist aus Tirol (Director: Hans Quest) .... Peter Weigand
1959: The Scarlet Baroness  (Director: Rudolf Jugert) .... Tailor
1959: Der Frosch mit der Maske (Director: Harald Reinl) .... Richard Gordon
1959: Mein Schatz komm mit ans blaue Meer (Director: Rudolf Schündler) .... Direktor Paul Marzez
1960: Final Destination: Red Lantern (Director: Rudolf Jugert) .... Martin Stelling
1960: Die zornigen jungen Männer (Director: Wolf Rilla) .... Dr. Jürgen Faber
1960: The Terrible People (Director: Harald Reinl) .... Chefinspektor Long
1961: Zu viele Köche (TV miniseries about the detective Nero Wolfe, Director: Kurt Wilhelm) .... Archie Goodwin
1961: The Dead Eyes of London (Director: Alfred Vohrer) .... Inspektor Larry Holt
1961: The Devil's Daffodil (Director: Ákos Ráthonyi) .... Jack Tarling
1961: The Strange Countess (Director: Josef von Báky) .... Inspektor Michael 'Mike' Dorn
1961: Auf Wiedersehen (Director: Harald Philipp) .... Ferdinand Steinbichler
1962:  (Director: Harald Reinl) .... Harry Raffold
1962: The Inn on the River (Director: Alfred Vohrer) .... Insp. Wade
1962: Mystery Submarine (Director: C. M. Pennington-Richards) .... Cmdr. Scheffler
1963:  (Director: Paul May) .... Strafverteidiger
1963: The Curse of the Yellow Snake (Director: Franz Josef Gottlieb) .... Clifford Lynn
1963: The White Spider (Director: Harald Reinl) .... Ralph Hubbard
1963: The Black Abbot (Director: Franz Josef Gottlieb) .... Dick Alford
1964: Room 13 (Director: Harald Reinl) .... Johnny Gray
1964: Der Hexer (Director: Alfred Vohrer) .... Inspector Bryan Edgar Higgins
1965: Hotel der toten Gäste .... Barney Blair
1965: The Last Tomahawk (Director: Harald Reinl) .... Captain Bill Hayward
1965: The Face of Fu Manchu (Director: Don Sharp) .... Carl Jannsen
1965: I Knew Her Well (Director: Antonio Pietrangeli) .... The Writer
1966:  (Director: José Luis Madrid) .... Clyde Smith
1966:  .... Robert B. Fuller
1966: Long Legs, Long Fingers (Director: Alfred Vohrer) .... Robert Hammond
1966: How to Seduce a Playboy (Director: Michael Pfleghar) .... Sokker
1967: Spy Today, Die Tomorrow (Director: Franz Josef Gottlieb) .... Army MP Haggan (uncredited)
1967: The Monk with the Whip (Director: Alfred Vohrer) .... Inspektor Higgins
1967:  .... Frankie Bargher
1967:  (TV miniseries,  Director: Wolfgang Becker) .... Edward Morrison
1968: Im Banne des Unheimlichen (Director: Alfred Vohrer) .... Inspektor Higgins
1968: Commandos (Director: Armando Crispino) .... Oberleutnant Heitzel Agen - Professor
1969: Seven Days Grace (Director: Alfred Vohrer) .... Hendriks
1969: The Unnaturals (Director: Antonio Margheriti) .... Ben Taylor
1969:  (TV film, Director: Wolfgang Becker) .... Chris Norman
1970: 11 Uhr 20 (TV miniseries, Director: Wolfgang Becker) .... Thomas Wassem
1971: Heißer Sand (TV film,) .... Jeff Barlow
1971: Olympia-Olympia (TV film, Director: Kurt Wilhelm) .... Schutzgeist
1972: What Have You Done to Solange? (Director: Massimo Dallamano) .... Inspector Barth
1972:  (Director: Rudolf Zehetgruber) .... Plato
1973: The Girl from Hong Kong (Director: Jürgen Roland) .... Frank Boyd
1973: The Flying Classroom (Director: Werner Jacobs) .... Dr. Johannes Böhk, gen. Justus
1977:  (Director: Michael Verhoeven) .... Mitglied der Rock & Roll Jury
1982: Der Fan (Director: Eckhart Schmidt) .... Mann im Fernsehen / Man on TV
1996:  (TV miniseries) – Director:  .... Earl Alessio Capilupi
1998:  (TV film,) .... Baldassarre
1998:  (TV miniseries, Director: Fabrizio Costa) .... Marke
2007:  (Director:  and ) .... Lord Dickham
2008:  (TV film, Director: Christoph Schrewe) .... Pope Innocent
2010:  (TV film, Director: Wolfgang Murnberger) .... Degenhard Schagowetz
2013:  (TV film, Director: Wolfgang Murnberger) .... Degenhard Schagowetz (final film role)

TV shows
1960–1961: Nur nicht nervös werden (ARD)
1973–1975: Der heiße Draht (SWF)
1975–1976: Spiel mit mir (SWF)
1977–1986:  (SWF)
1980–1991: Heut' abend (ARD)
1990–1994: Ja oder Nein (ARD)

Documentation
 1988–2003: Terra Australis (20 films by Fuchsberger about people and landscapes of his adopted country)
 2011: Germaine Damar – Der tanzende Stern (TV) – Regie: Michael Wenk (Fuchsberger as interviewee commemorating his former film partner Germaine Damar)

 Audiobooks 
 2011: Altwerden ist nichts für Feiglinge.'' [Growing old is not for cowards] Publisher: Gütersloher Verlagshaus (Biography, read by Joachim Fuchsberger), .

References

External links

Joachim Fuchsberger in the German Dubbing Card Index

1927 births
2014 deaths
Male actors from Stuttgart
People from the Free People's State of Württemberg
German male film actors
German male stage actors
German male television actors
20th-century German male actors
21st-century German male actors
German game show hosts
German television personalities
German prisoners of war in World War II held by the United States
German prisoners of war in World War II held by the Soviet Union
Commanders Crosses of the Order of Merit of the Federal Republic of Germany
Recipients of the Bambi (prize)
Recipients of the Romy (TV award)
German prisoners of war in World War II held by the United Kingdom
Naturalised citizens of Australia
ARD (broadcaster) people
Hitler Youth members
Fallschirmjäger of World War II
Deaths from organ failure